The Voire is a small river in France, in the drainage basin of the Seine. Its source is in Mertrud, in the Haute-Marne department. It flows through Montier-en-Der and Puellemontier, and empties into the river Aube at Chalette-sur-Voire, in the Aube department.

References

Rivers of France
Rivers of Aube
Rivers of Haute-Marne
Rivers of Grand Est